Dr. Dudley Peter Allen (1852 – 1915) was an American surgeon, teacher, writer, and art patron.

He was born in a family of physicians and was educated first at Oberlin College and later Harvard Medical School, becoming an M.D. in 1879. After briefly working in Massachusetts General Hospital, he went to Europe to attend medical and surgical lectures and clinics in Berlin, Vienna, London, Paris, and other medical centers. In 1883 he settled in Cleveland where he began a surgical career in the department of surgery in the Western Reserve University, where in time he became professor of surgery and clinical surgery. He also joined the surgical staff of the Lakeside Hospital where ultimately he became surgeon-in-chief. His professional practice rapidly grew to large proportions, and he was frequently called for operations or consultations to distant parts of the state and even beyond it. During all this time he was a frequent contributor to medical literature, and an active supporter and a patron of the Cleveland Medical Library. On August 4, 1892 he married the local wealthy philanthropist Elisabeth Severance in Cleveland.

He wrote a chapter in the 1887 Magazine of Western History where he described his predecessor, Dr. Horace A. Ackley, a brilliant man of many talents, "On the organization of the medical College in Cleveland, he was appointed to the chair of surgery, which he occupied until 1855."

He held many honorary positions during his life. At one time he was president of the Ohio State Medical Society, and for a number of years was secretary, and finally president (1906–1907), of the American Surgical Association. About this time he was elected an honorary fellow of the Philadelphia Academy of Surgery, and later was awarded the degree of LL. D. from his own College (Oberlin). In 1910 he resigned his medical positions and made a tour around the world with his wife.

He was an art collector of paintings and engravings, but especially of old Chinese porcelains. On this subject, he became a recognized expert. His comprehensive interest also included architecture, horticulture and music, and his knowledge and judgment in these specialties were astonishing in one whose life-work lay in other directions. Dr. Allen died suddenly of pneumonia in New York City on Wednesday, Jan. 6, 1915.

Legacy

After his death his widow commissioned several buildings in his name; most notably the estate "Glen Allen" where she lived the rest of her life, the local medical library, and the Oberlin Art museum. While working on finishing his work expanding St. Luke's hospital, she met and married her second husband, Dr. Francis Fleury Prentiss, who had taken over Dr. Allen's position. When Dr. Prentiss died, she took over his position herself.

References

Biography written by George Howard Monks : 

1852 births
1915 deaths
American surgeons
Harvard Medical School alumni
Oberlin College alumni
People from Kinsman, Ohio